Mark Edur (born 11 December 1998) is an Estonian footballer who plays as a defender for Belper Town.

Career

Before the 2019 season, Edur signed for Estonian top flight side Viljandi Tulevik from Levadia-2 in the Estonian second division.

In 2020, he signed for Bulgarian club Etar. He spent that season with the club before leaving in 2021.

He moved to Belper Town in March 2022.

References

External links
 
 

Estonian expatriate footballers
First Professional Football League (Bulgaria) players
1998 births
Footballers from Tallinn
Association football defenders
Meistriliiga players
FC Etar Veliko Tarnovo players
FCI Levadia Tallinn players
Viljandi JK Tulevik players
Estonian footballers
Esiliiga players
Living people
Expatriate footballers in Bulgaria
Estonian expatriate sportspeople in Bulgaria
Belper Town F.C. players